Randall Farm is a historic farm and national historic district located at Cortland in Cortland County, New York.  The district includes six contributing buildings and one contributing structure.  It includes a cobblestone farmhouse built between 1825 and 1840 with a distinctive Colonial Revival porch added about 1920.  Also on the property is a -story frame cottage, a dairy barn, garage, playhouse, carriage barn, smokehouse, saltbox shaped barn, small gabled barn, sugar shack, and milk house. The property also includes distinctive landscape elements.

It was listed on the National Register of Historic Places in 2000.

References

Farms on the National Register of Historic Places in New York (state)
Historic districts on the National Register of Historic Places in New York (state)
Federal architecture in New York (state)
Colonial Revival architecture in New York (state)
Houses completed in 1840
Cobblestone architecture
Historic districts in Cortland County, New York
Houses in Cortland County, New York
National Register of Historic Places in Cortland County, New York